Le Havre – Octeville Airport  is an airport serving the city of Le Havre in France.

Facilities
It has one paved runway designated 05/23 which measures .

Airlines and destinations
After Twin Jet left, there are currently no scheduled services to or from Le Havre. There are however irregular charter flights taking people to beaches in Southern Europe and Greece

Statistics

References

External links
  Aéroport du Havre-Octeville, official site
 
 

Airports in Normandy
Buildings and structures in Seine-Maritime
Transport in Normandy
Airfields of the United States Army Air Forces Air Transport Command in the European Theater